Litteratura Serpentium is a herpetological magazine published by the European Snake Society in Dutch since 1980, and in English since 1983.()

It was previously published bi-monthly, but its frequency switched to quarterly.

References

External links 
 Website
 Contents, volume 16-28

Bi-monthly magazines published in the Netherlands
Dutch-language magazines
English-language magazines
Herpetology
Magazines established in 1980
Medical magazines
Quarterly magazines published in the Netherlands